Ibrahim Jaffa Condeh (born in Kabala, Sierra Leone) is a Sierra Leonean journalist and news anchor. He is the senior journalist for the Freetown based Concord Times newspaper. Although Condeh is primarily based in Freetown, he often report on location for breaking news stories throughout Sierra Leone. He is a graduate of Fourah Bay College with a master's degree in journalism (FBC). Condeh is a Muslim and a member of the Mandingo ethnic group.

External links
http://allafrica.com/stories/200904150793.html

Sierra Leonean journalists
Living people
Sierra Leonean Mandingo people
Sierra Leonean Muslims
People from Koinadugu District
Year of birth missing (living people)